Pictou is an unincorporated community in Huerfano County, Colorado, United States.

History
A post office called Pictou was established in 1889, and remained in operation until 1932. The community was named after Pictou, Canada, the native home of a mining official.

See also

References

External links

Unincorporated communities in Huerfano County, Colorado
Unincorporated communities in Colorado